Leo Vincelette Felton (born 1970, Silver Spring, Maryland) is an American white supremacist of African American descent who was convicted of bank robbery and plotting to build a bomb in Boston to attack Jewish-Americans. He is an Odinist. Felton renounced white supremacy and neo-Nazism in 2008, embracing his mixed-race heritage, and has written extensively on his journey into white supremacy and his subsequent disillusionment. Felton was released from prison in 2019 after serving 17 years.

Early life
Leo Felton's father, Calvin Felton (b. 1930), was a black architect, while his mother, Corinne Vincelette (b. 1931), was a white voice and diction professor who became involved in the civil rights movement. His parents divorced when he was two, and he was raised in Gaithersburg, Maryland.

Criminal activities

Felton spent 11 years (1990–2001) in prison for the assault of a taxi driver during a road rage incident. His prison sentence was extended for attacking two black inmates. In prison, he became an organizer for white supremacist groups, organizing book reviews and exercise while obscuring his ancestry. He found inspiration from the White Order of Thule and read Francis Parker Yockey's Imperium, which led him to believe that race was spiritual instead of biological.

Out of prison and married, Felton began an affair with Erica Chase, a 21-year-old white supremacist. Felton robbed a bank with a friend from prison and forged money in order to buy materials to create a fertilizer bomb. It is unclear what the target was to be.  An attendant at a donut shop spotted a counterfeit $20 Chase tried to pass her. She alerted an off-duty Boston police officer, who then arrested  Felton and Chase. Felton was sentenced to 27 years in prison in 2002 for bank robbery, conspiracy to commit bank robbery and other crimes.

Since 2008
Felton changed his last name from Felton to Oladimu in 2008.

Felton is listed as "LEO V OLADIMU" on the bop.gov Inmate Locator website, Register Number: 23663-038.

Felton was released from federal custody on December 12, 2020.

See also
American History X
Clayton Bigsby
Dan Burros 
Frank Collin
Erik Jan Hanussen
Jack van Tongeren
Anthony Pierpont

References
 

American neo-Nazis
African-American people
1970 births
Living people
People from Silver Spring, Maryland
People from Gaithersburg, Maryland
American modern pagans